The 2014 United States House of Representatives elections in New Jersey were held on Tuesday, November 4, 2014 to elect the 12 U.S. representatives from the state of New Jersey, one from each of the state's 12 congressional districts. The elections coincided with the 2014 United States midterm elections for other federal and state offices, including U.S. House elections in other states and a U.S. Senate election in New Jersey.

As of 2022, this is the last time New Jersey’s delegation to the United States House of Representatives was tied.

Overview

By district
Results of the 2014 United States House of Representatives elections in New Jersey by district:

District 1

The 1st district is based in South Jersey and includes most of Camden County along with parts of Burlington County and Gloucester County. Democrat Rob Andrews represented the district from 1990 until his resignation on February 18, 2014. New Jersey Governor Chris Christie called for a special election on November 4 (concurrent with the general election) to fill the remaining months of Andrews' term.

Radio personality and former NFL linebacker Garry Cobb and perennial candidate Lee Lucas ran in the Republican primary.

Democratic primary
Democratic state senator Donald Norcross ran to succeed Andrews. The brother of businessman and political boss George Norcross, Donald was the "heavy favorite" to win the seat. Shortly after declaring his candidacy, he had been endorsed by every Democratic member of New Jersey's congressional delegation as well as New Jersey Senate President Stephen M. Sweeney, New Jersey General Assembly Majority Leader Louis Greenwald, Camden Mayor Dana Redd and former governor Jim Florio. Matthew Harris, who had been running against Andrews had announced that he would continue his campaign against Norcross, but quickly withdrew, citing the "cascade of endorsements" for Norcross. Logan Township Mayor Frank Minor and Marine Corps veteran Frank Broomell also ran in the Democratic primary.

Candidates

Nominee
 Donald Norcross, state senator

Eliminated in primary
 Frank Broomell, United States Marine Corps veteran
 Frank Minor, mayor of Logan Township

Withdrew
 Matthew Harris

Declined
 Rob Andrews, former U.S. Representative

Results

Republican primary

Candidates

Nominee
 Garry Cobb, radio personality and ex-NFL player

Eliminated in primary
 Lee Lucas, former congressional and General Assembly candidate
 Claire Gustafson
 Gerard McManus

Note: None of the Republican candidates filed for the special election to fill Congressman Rob Andrews unexpired term.

Results

General election

Endorsements

Results

District 2

The 2nd district is based in South Jersey and is the biggest congressional district in the state. It includes all of Atlantic, Cape May, Cumberland and Salem Counties and parts of Burlington, Camden, Gloucester, and Ocean counties.

Republican primary

Candidates

Nominee
 Frank LoBiondo, incumbent U.S. Representative

Eliminated in primary
 Mike Assad, Absecon Board of Education member and candidate for this seat in 2012

Results

Democratic primary

Candidates

Nominee
 Bill Hughes, a former federal prosecutor and the son of former Congressman William J. Hughes

Eliminated in primary
 David Cole, former White House aide and Barack Obama campaign staffer

Declined
 Lou Greenwald, Majority Leader of the New Jersey General Assembly
 Jeff Van Drew, state senator
 Jim Whelan, state senator

Results

General election

Endorsements

Polling

Results

District 3

The 3rd district is based in South Jersey and includes parts of Burlington and Ocean counties. Republican Jon Runyan, who represented the district since 2011, retired, citing a desire to spend more time with his family.

Republican primary

Candidates

Nominee
 Tom MacArthur, former mayor of Randolph

Eliminated in primary
 Steve Lonegan, former mayor of Bogota, candidate for governor in 2005 and 2009 and nominee for the U.S. Senate in 2013

Withdrew
 Maurice Hill, retired U.S. Navy Rear Admiral and Toms River Township Councilman
 James Byrnes, president of Berkeley Township Council
 David W. Wolfe, state assemblyman

Declined
 Randy Brown, Mayor of Evesham
 Bruce Garganio, Burlington County Freeholder
 John Giordano, Assistant Commissioner for Compliance and Enforcement at the New Jersey Department of Environmental Protection
 Jon Runyan, incumbent U.S. Representative

Polling

Results

Democratic primary

Candidates

Nominee
 Aimee Belgard, Burlington County Freeholder

Eliminated in primary
 Howard Kleinhendler, corporate lawyer and nominee for New Jersey's 4th congressional district in 2010

Withdrew
 Jack Fanous, co-founder and executive director of the G.I. Go Fund

Declined
 Herb Conaway, state assemblyman
 Troy Singleton, state assemblyman

Results

General election

Endorsements

Polling

Predictions

Results

District 4

The fourth district is represented by Republican Congressman Chris Smith. Ruben Scolavino, a criminal defense attorney and a former candidate for Monmouth County Sheriff, was endorsed by the Mercer, Monmouth, and Ocean County Democratic committees.

Republican primary

Candidates

Nominee
 Chris Smith, incumbent U.S. Representative

Results

Democratic primary

Candidates

Nominee
 Ruben Scolavino, criminal defense attorney and former candidate for Monmouth County Sheriff

Results

General election

Endorsements

Results

District 5

Republican incumbent Scott Garrett won re-election in the fifth district in the 2012 House of Representatives elections. Redistricting made the district more competitive for members of the Democratic Party.

Republican primary

Candidates

Nominee
 Scott Garrett, incumbent U.S. Representative

Results

Democratic primary
Roy Cho, a Democrat who has worked for the governor's office and Port Authority of New York and New Jersey, ran against the incumbent Garrett.

Candidates

Nominee
 Roy Cho, attorney, former congressional aide, and former gubernatorial aide

Eliminated in primary
 Diane Sare, LaRouche movement activist, candidate for this seat in 2012, independent candidate for governor in 2013

Declined
 Robert M. Gordon, state senator
 Tracy Silna Zur, Bergen County Freeholder

Results

General election

Campaign
In the general election, the two largest newspapers in New Jersey both endorsed Cho. The Star-Ledger called Garrett "a retrograde culture warrior who wants to eliminate a woman’s right to choose" and criticized his support for the 2013 budget sequester, which hurt New Jersey; by contrast, Cho is "a centrist who actually wants to govern."  The Bergen Record criticized Garrett as "a dogmatic conservative who believes ideology trumps compromise" and agreed with Cho's call for a federal role in improving the region's transportation infrastructure.

Endorsements

Polling

Predictions

Results

District 6

The sixth district, represented by Democratic Congressman Frank Pallone, was considered a long-shot pick up opportunity for Republicans, but only if Pallone retires. Old Bridge attorney Anthony Wilkinson ran in the Republican primary.

Democratic primary

Candidates

Nominee
 Frank Pallone, incumbent U.S. Representative

Results

Republican primary

Candidates

Nominee
 Anthony Wilkinson, attorney

Withdrawn
 Anna Little, former mayor of Highlands and nominee for this seat in 2010 & 2012

Results

General election

Endorsements

Results

District 7

In the seventh district, incumbent Republican Congressman Leonard Lance faced a primary challenge from perennial challenger David Larsen.

Republican primary

Candidates

Nominee
 Leonard Lance, incumbent U.S. Representative

Eliminated in primary
 David Larsen, businessman and candidate for this seat in 2010 & 2012

Results

Democratic primary

Candidates

Nominee
 Janice Kovach, Mayor of Clinton and Secretary of the New Jersey Democratic Party

Results

General election

Endorsements

Results

District 8

The eighth district is represented by Democratic Congressman Albio Sires.

Democratic primary

Candidates

Nominee
 Albio Sires, incumbent U.S. Representative

Results

Republican primary

Candidates

Nominee
 Jude-Anthony Tiscornia, attorney and State Assembly candidate in 2013

Results

General election

Endorsements

Results

District 9

The ninth district is represented by Democratic Congressman Bill Pascrell.

Democratic primary

Candidates

Nominee
 Bill Pascrell, incumbent U.S. Representative

Results

Republican primary

Candidates

Nominee
 Dierdre Paul, college professor and State Assembly candidate in 2013

Withdrew
 Michael Oren Epstein, attorney

Results

General election

Endorsements

Results

District 10

The tenth district is represented by Democratic Congressman Donald Payne. Curtis Alphonzo Vaughn III, Robert Louis Toussaint, and Aaron Fraser are also running the Democratic primary. Yolanda Dentley is running in the Republican primary.

Democratic primary

Candidates

Nominee
 Donald Payne, Jr., incumbent U.S. Representative

Eliminated in primary
 Aaron Fraser
 Robert Toussaint, independent candidate in 2010
 Curtis Vaughn

Results

Republican primary

Candidates

Nominee
 Yolanda Dentley, middle school vice principal

Results

Independents

Candidates
 Dark Angel, economics major and theater minor at Kean University

General election

Endorsements

Results

District 11

The 11th district is held by Republican Congressman Rodney Frelinghuysen. Frelinghuysen and Rick Van Glahn are running in the Republican primary.

Republican primary

Candidates

Nominee
 Rodney Frelinghuysen, incumbent U.S. Representative

Eliminated in primary
 Rick Van Glahn, home improvement contractor

Results

Democratic primary

Candidates

Nominee
 Mark Dunec, management consultant

Eliminated in primary
 Lee Anne Brogowski
 Brian Murphy

Results

General election

Endorsements

Results

District 12

The 12th district is based in Central Jersey and includes parts of Mercer, Middlesex, Somerset and Union counties. The district is known for its research centers and educational institutions such as Princeton University, Institute for Advanced Study, Johnson & Johnson and Bristol-Myers Squibb. Democrat Rush D. Holt, Jr., who represented the district since 1999, retiring, leaving the seat open.

Democratic primary

Candidates

Nominee
 Bonnie Watson Coleman, state assemblywoman and former chairwoman of the New Jersey Democratic Party

Eliminated in primary
 Upendra J. Chivukula, Deputy Speaker of the New Jersey General Assembly and nominee for New Jersey's 7th congressional district in 2012
 Linda R. Greenstein, state senator
 Andrew Zwicker, Princeton University plasma physicist

Declined
 Daniel R. Benson, state assemblyman
 Jun Choi, former mayor of Edison
 Paula Covello, Mercer County clerk
 Wayne DeAngelo, state assemblyman
 Jerry Green, Speaker Pro Tempore of the New Jersey General Assembly
 Reed Gusciora, state assemblyman
 Rush D. Holt, Jr., incumbent U.S. Representative
 Brian M. Hughes, Mercer County Executive and nominee for New Jersey's 4th congressional district in 1992
 Colleen Mahr, Mayor of Fanwood
 Jim McGreevey, former governor
 Ed Potosnak, executive director of the New Jersey League of Conservation Voters and nominee for New Jersey's 7th congressional district in 2010
 Linda Stender, state assemblywoman and nominee for New Jersey's 7th congressional district in 2006 and 2008
 Shirley Turner, state senator

Polling

Results

Republican primary

Candidates

Nominee
 Alieta Eck, former president of the Association of American Physicians and Surgeons, health care reform advocate and candidate for the U.S. Senate in 2013

Declined
 John Crowley, biotech executive and subject of the film Extraordinary Measures
 Andrew Sidamon-Eristoff, New Jersey State Treasurer, former member of the New York City Council and former New York State Commissioner of Tax and Finance
 Scott Sipprelle, venture capitalist and candidate for the seat in 2010

Results

General election

Endorsements

Results

See also
 2014 United States House of Representatives elections
 2014 United States elections

References

External links
U.S. House elections in New_Jersey, 2014 at Ballotpedia
Campaign contributions at OpenSecrets

New Jersey
2014
United States House of Representatives